Annie Booth (US) (born 1989) is an American jazz pianist and educator. Since the age of 16, she studied with jazz organist Pat Bianchi, pianist Jeff Jenkins and Art Lande. She studied at the Colorado Conservatory for the Jazz Arts and went on to earn a Bachelor of Music in Jazz Studies, and a Masters of Jazz Performance and Pedagogy from the Thompson Jazz Studies Program at the University of Colorado Boulder.

She was named "Best In Denver - Jazz" from Westword in 2015, 2016 and 2017. In 2016, she toured Mexico with the New York Jazz All Stars - Greg Gisbert Quartet (sponsored by Jazz at Lincoln Center) that included musicians Greg Gisbert, Tommy Campbell, and Mike Boone (side artist for Buddy Rich and John Swana). She has arranged, recorded and performed with Yamaha Artist, Bob Montgomery (Clark Terry big band, Nancy Wilson, Tony Bennett and Quincy Jones). She has also opened for jazz pianist, Joey Alexander.

Booth was awarded the 2017 Herb Alpert Young Jazz Composer Award and the 2017 ASCAP Foundation Phoebe Jacobs Prize by the American Society of Composers, Authors and Publishers (ASCAP). Her trio has performed and toured all over North America, and has appeared at numerous jazz clubs and festivals including the South by Southwest festival in 2017 and as the first artist-in-residence at Nocturne Jazz & Supper Club. In 2015 she was featured as part of KUVO's (89.3 FM) 30 Under 30 program.

Booth has performed on movie soundtracks, such as her work on Our Souls at Night (2017) starring Jane Fonda and Robert Redford. In 2019 she was selected for the "2020 Young Composer" Showcase by the Jazz Education Network and her composition Jolly Beach was performed by The U.S. Navy Band Commodores at the 2020 conference in New Orleans, LA. In 2020, Annie Booth was the recipient of the Downbeat Jazz Magazine "Graduate College Outstanding Performance" award.

Since 2015, Booth has worked with The Colorado Conservatory for the Jazz Arts (CCJA), a non-profit jazz education outreach organization for middle and high school students. In 2017, she created the SheBop jazz program, a series of jazz workshops and clinics for young women, ages 10–18.

Booth has taught courses at the University of Northern Colorado (UNC), the University of Colorado - Boulder School of Music (CU), workshops at the University of North Texas - Denton (UNT), and the University of Nevada, Reno, and is currently an adjunct faculty member at the Lamont School of Music at the University of Denver (DU). Booth was chosen by Westword Magazine as one of Denver's top 10 jazz musicians in 2021.

Annie Booth is currently the Managing Director for the International Society of Jazz Arrangers & Composers (ISJAC).

Discography

As leader
Alpenglo (AnnieBelle Music, 2022)
The Annie Booth Trio with Max Wellman (2018)
Abundance (with Greg Gisbert, 2017)
Festive (2016)
Wanderlust (Dazzle Records, 2014)

As side artist
Bob Montgomery - La Familia: The Music of Bob Montgomery
Tom Gershwin - Live at Mighty Fine
Jason Klobnak - New Chapter
Ryan Fourt - Big Slick
Jeff Riley - Jazz Suite
Paul Mullikin - Time Is Now

References

External links 
Official site

Living people
American jazz pianists
1989 births
21st-century American women pianists
21st-century American pianists